The 1961 Washington Senators season was the team's inaugural season, having been established as a replacement for the previous franchise of the same name, which relocated to the Twin Cities of Minnesota following the 1960 season, becoming the Minnesota Twins. The Senators finished in a tie for ninth place in the ten-team American League with a record of 61–100, 47½ games behind the World Champion New York Yankees. It was also the team's only season at Griffith Stadium before moving its games to D.C. Stadium for the following season. The expansion team drew 597,287 fans, tenth and last in the circuit. The old Senators had drawn 743,404 fans in 1960.

Offseason
The Senators, along with the Los Angeles Angels, were the first ever American League expansion teams. Both teams participated in Major League Baseball's first ever expansion draft. The Senators used their first pick in the 1960 Major League Baseball expansion draft to select pitcher Bobby Shantz from the New York Yankees (while the Angels picked Eli Grba). Grba wound up playing two-plus seasons for Los Angeles before returning to the minor leagues. However, Shantz never played for the Senators, as he was traded just two days later to the Pittsburgh Pirates for Harry Bright, Bennie Daniels, and R. C. Stevens, all of whom played for the Senators in 1961.

A 1992 Associated Press article which looked prospectively to the Rockies and Marlins expansion draft and retroactively at previous expansion drafts stated: "The Senators drafted for experience and got burned when players such as Dave Sisler, John Klippstein, Tom Sturdivant, Dale Long, Bobby Klaus and Gene Woodling didn't produce."

Notable transactions 
 November 28, 1960: Ray Semproch was drafted by the Senators from the Los Angeles Dodgers in the 1960 rule 5 draft.
 December 14, 1960: 1960 MLB expansion draft
Jim King was drafted by the Senators from the Cleveland Indians.
Coot Veal was drafted by the Senators from the Detroit Tigers.

Regular season
As an expansion team, the Senators were not expected to do well. They finished tied for last in the league with the Kansas City Athletics. They also finished 9 games behind their expansion brethren, the Angels. One bright spot was pitcher Dick Donovan, who led the American League in earned run average and WHIP, making the All-Star team and finishing 17th in league MVP voting.

Season standings

Record vs. opponents

Opening Day lineup
In the first game in franchise history, the "Presidential Opener" then held every year in Washington, the Senators were defeated by the Chicago White Sox, 4–3, on Monday, April 10, 1961.  With leadoff man Coot Veal getting its first-ever hit (an infield single)  in the first inning, Washington jumped out to a quick 2–0 advantage and led 3–1 after two innings. But the Senators were blanked thereafter and committed four errors, leading to two unearned runs, as Chicago battled back to win. Roy Sievers, former star of the previous Washington franchise, drove in a pair of White Sox runs with a home run and a sacrifice fly. It was the last Presidential Opener in the history of Griffith Stadium, and the first one in which John F. Kennedy threw out the first ball.

Roster

Player stats

Batting

Starters by position
Note: Pos = Position; G = Games played; AB = At bats; H = Hits; Avg. = Batting average; HR = Home runs; RBI = Runs batted in

Other batters
Note: G = Games played; AB = At bats; H = Hits; Avg. = Batting average; HR = Home runs; RBI = Runs batted in

Pitching

Starting pitchers 
Note: G = Games pitched; IP = Innings pitched; W = Wins; L = Losses; ERA = Earned run average; SO = Strikeouts

Other pitchers 
Note: G = Games pitched; IP = Innings pitched; W = Wins; L = Losses; ERA = Earned run average; SO = Strikeouts

Relief pitchers 
Note: G = Games pitched; W = Wins; L = Losses; SV = Saves; ERA = Earned run average; SO = Strikeouts

Farm system

LEAGUE CHAMPIONS: Middlesboro

Awards and honors
1961 American League ERA leader
Dick Donovan

References

External links
1961 Washington Senators team page at Baseball Reference
1961 Washington Senators team page at www.baseball-almanac.com

Texas Rangers seasons
Washington Senators season
Inaugural Major League Baseball seasons by team
Washing